Paul Tittl (born November 23, 1961) is an American businessman and politician.

From Manitowoc, Wisconsin, Tittl owns Vacuum & Sew Center and Paintball Paul's. Tittl also served on the Manitowoc County Board of Supervisor and Manitowoc Common Council. In November 2012, Tittl was elected to the Wisconsin State Assembly as a Republican.

References

Living people
People from Manitowoc, Wisconsin
Businesspeople from Wisconsin
Wisconsin city council members
County supervisors in Wisconsin
Republican Party members of the Wisconsin State Assembly
1961 births
21st-century American politicians
People from Delavan, Wisconsin